The Eulen Open Galea was a golf tournament on the Challenge Tour that was played at R.S.G. de Neguri in Bilbao, Spain from 1995 to 1998.

Winners

References

External links
Coverage on the Challenge Tour's official site

Former Challenge Tour events
Golf tournaments in Spain